Superblue or Super Blue may refer to:
 Superblue (born 1956), Trinidadian musician
 Superblue (band), American jazz ensemble
 Super Blue, a 1978 album by Freddie Hubbard
 SuperBlue, a 2021 album by Kurt Elling and Charlie Hunter

See also 
 Super Blues, a 1967 album by Bo Diddley, Muddy Waters, and Little Walter
 Superblues, a 1994 album by Pete York